Anton Lengauer-Stockner (born 18 November 1961) is an Austrian biathlete. He competed in the relay event at the 1988 Winter Olympics.

References

1961 births
Living people
Austrian male biathletes
Olympic biathletes of Austria
Biathletes at the 1988 Winter Olympics
Sportspeople from Tyrol (state)